Gerald Cummins (born 11 November 1958) is a New Zealand cricketer. He played in three first-class and four List A matches for Canterbury in 1978/79.

See also
 List of Canterbury representative cricketers

References

External links
 

1958 births
Living people
Canterbury cricketers
Cricketers from Rangiora
New Zealand cricketers